The submandibular lymph nodes (submaxillary glands in older texts), three to six in number, are lymph nodes beneath the body of the mandible in the submandibular triangle, and rest on the superficial surface of the submandibular gland.

One gland, the middle gland of Stahr, which lies on the facial artery as it turns over the mandible, is the most constant of the series; small lymph glands are sometimes found on the deep surface of the submandibular gland.

The afferents of the submandibular glands drain the medial canthus, the cheek, the side of the nose, the upper lip, the lateral part of the lower lip, the gums, and the anterior part of the margin of the tongue.

Efferent lymph vessels from the facial and submental lymph nodes also enter the submandibular glands. Their efferent vessels pass to the superior deep cervical lymph nodes.

Additional images

References

External links 
 Archived Diagram via umich.edu - rollover to see labels
 https://web.archive.org/web/20080216031919/http://www.med.mun.ca/anatomyts/head/hnl3a.htm
 Diagram at Baylor College of Medicine 
 http://www.patient.info/
 http://www.aafp.org/afp/20021201/2103.html
 http://www.emedicine.com/ent/topic306.htm#section~anatomy_of_the_cervical_lymphatics

Lymphatics of the head and neck